The Rebellion Festival, formerly Holidays in the Sun and the Wasted Festival is a British  punk rock festival first held in 1996.  The festival has attracted mainstream press coverage from such sources as The Guardian, The Independent, The Daily Telegraph and Kerrang.

The first festival in 1996 was held at the Winter Gardens, Blackpool England. It is still held there now, although on some years the festival has been held in nearby Morecambe. Festivals have also been held under the Rebellion and earlier brand names in Australia, United States, Japan, Germany, Netherlands, Italy, Belgium, the Basque Country, Ireland and Austria.

It is still a family-run, family-orientated event which celebrates Punk in all its forms, but also puts on bands from other alternative genres plus some Glam Rock artists and seminal bands from the 1960s and 1970s . There are up to seven music stages plus also an acoustic stage, a literary stage and a Punk Art gallery along with many workshops, and stalls for clothes, music and other products.
Each year, over 300 acts perform at the festival over a four-day period, usually spread over the first weekend in August from Thursday to Sunday. The festival 
maintains a positive relationship with Blackpool Council and the people of Blackpool in general and has been commended for its involvement with local charities.

Another punk festival, Nice 'N Sleazy in Morecambe, began life as an offshoot of Wasted in Morecambe, the 3B's (Breakfast, Beer, Bands) Festival, providing campsite accommodation with an unofficial stage.  When Wasted reverted to Blackpool in 2006, the Morecambe campsite event continued as a separate festival.

2017 was the 21st anniversary of the festival which coincided with the 40th anniversary celebrations of Punk. The 2020 event was postponed to 2021 because of the COVID-19 pandemic and replaced with an online festival.  In 2021 - although the full festival was postponed again until 2022 - organisers held a smaller replacement live event: the HITS 25 25th anniversary commemoration of the original 1996 Holiday In The Sun festival, announced at short notice as soon as the way was clear with regard to Covid regulations,.

The full festival resumed in 2022 with an additional event: R-Fest, held outdoors on the seafront on the Comedy Carpet.

Festivals

UK

Rest of the World

See also 
 List of punk rock festivals

References

Rock festivals in England
Punk rock festivals